Ward Lock travel guides or Red Guides (1870s–1970s) were tourist guide books to the British Isles and continental Europe published by Ward, Lock & Co. of London. The firm proclaimed them "amusing and readable" and the "cheapest and most trustworthy guides." To other readers the books were promotional and "rarely critical." Compared to similar late 19th century series such as Methuen & Co.'s Little Guides, the Ward Lock guides emphasized "travel practicalities."

List of Ward Lock guides by geographic coverage

Belgium
 
  + Index

England

East Midlands region

East of England region

London region 
 
 1901 ed.
  + Index
  + Index

North East England region

North West England region

South East England region

South West England region

West Midlands (region)

Yorkshire and the Humber region

France

Ireland

Italy

Netherlands
 
 
  + Index

Scotland

Switzerland

Wales

References

External links
 Ward Lock Red Guides 

Travel guide books
Series of books
Publications established in the 1870s
Ward, Lock & Co. books
Tourism in the United Kingdom